Khusf County is in South Khorasan province, Iran. The capital of the county is the city of Khusf. At the 2006 census, the region's population (as Khusf District of Birjand County) was 24,922 in 7,254 households. The following census in 2011 counted 29,019 people in 7,564 households. At the 2016 census, the county's population was 27,600 in 7,492 households, by which time the district had been separated from the county to form Khusf County.

Administrative divisions

The population history and structural changes of Khusf County's administrative divisions over three consecutive censuses are shown in the following table. The latest census shows two districts, five rural districts, and two cities.

References

 

Counties of South Khorasan Province